Colonel Frank Seely Academy (formerly Colonel Frank Seely School) is a coeducational secondary school and sixth form located in Calverton in the English county of Nottinghamshire.

The school is named after Frank Evelyn Seely (1864–1928), a former High Sheriff of Nottinghamshire and Councillor for Calverton on Nottinghamshire County Council. In 1957 the Colonel Frank Seely School was opened in memory of him. The school is now sponsored by Redhill Academy Trust.

Colonel Frank Seely Academy offers GCSEs and BTECs as programmes of study for pupils, while students in the sixth form have the option to study from a range of A Levels and further BTECs.

Notable former pupils
 Chris Adcock, badminton player
 Christopher Dean, figure skater and Olympic gold medalist
 Neil Hall, PhD, geneticist
 Mark Spencer, Conservative MP since 2010 for Sherwood
 Richard Whitehead, athlete
 Sam Wood, cricketer

References

External links
 Official Website

Secondary schools in Nottinghamshire
Educational institutions established in 1957
1957 establishments in England
Academies in Nottinghamshire
Calverton, Nottinghamshire